Kitagata is a town in Western Uganda. It is one of the urban centers in Sheema District.

Location
Kitagata is located in Sheema County South, Sheema District, in Western Uganda. The coordinates of Kitagata are:0° 40' 21.00"S, 30° 9' 18.00"E (Latitude:-0.672499; Longitude:30.154991).

Points of interest

 The offices of Kitagata Town Council 
 Kitagata Central Market
 The Ishaka-Kagamba Road - The highway passes through the center of town in a north-south direction.
 Kitagata General Hospital - A public 120-bed hospital administered by the Uganda Ministry of Health, located on the Kitagata-Rukungiri Road, just west of the center of town.
 Kitagata Secondary School - A public, mixed, non-residential secondary school (S1 - S6)

Kitagata bubaare village
 Sheema District
 Ankole sub-region
 Western Region, Uganda

References

External links
 Kitagata Is Also The Name of A Subcounty in Uganda

Populated places in Western Region, Uganda
Cities in the Great Rift Valley
Sheema District